60S ribosome subunit biogenesis protein NIP7 homolog is a protein that in humans is encoded by the NIP7 gene.

Interactions 

NIP7 has been shown to interact with NOL8.

References

Further reading